Weedens is an unincorporated community in the town of Wilson, Sheboygan County, in the U.S. state of Wisconsin.

History
The community was named for G. W. Weeden, a Sheboygan County judge.

References

Unincorporated communities in Sheboygan County, Wisconsin
Unincorporated communities in Wisconsin